LeFlore County may refer to:
Leflore County, Mississippi
LeFlore County, Oklahoma